Verónica Mleziva (born 10 April 1983) is a Spanish weightlifter. She represented Spain at international competitions. 

She competed at 2001 European Junior & U23 Weightlifting Championships, the 2003 World Weightlifting Championships.

References 

Living people
1983 births

Spanish female weightlifters
21st-century Spanish women